William Clarridge trained as a painter before taking up documentary photography in the early 1850s. Two albums of his photographs survive documenting the town of Berkhamsted. These form one of the earliest documentary records of English village life. Amongst his pictures are a number of photographs of young girls which were sold at Sotheby's in 1984 described as "in the style of Lewis Carroll". There is evidence that he may have visited Christ Church, Oxford in the mid-1850s where Lewis Carroll was professor of mathematics.

19th-century British painters
British male painters
19th-century English photographers
Year of birth missing
Year of death missing
Photographers from Hertfordshire
19th-century British male artists